This is a list of electoral results for the electoral district of Butler in Western Australian state elections.

Members for Butler

Election results

Elections in the 2020s

Elections in the 2010s

References

Western Australian state electoral results by district